Dancing Hare (formerly Lady Ghislaine and Lady Mona K) is a superyacht built by Amels in 1986.

Built for Emad Khashoggi, it was then purchased, also in 1986, by Robert Maxwell, who died by drowning while cruising on the yacht off the Canary Islands. It was then owned by an Arabian businessman who sold it in 2017. The new owner, Anna Murdoch, had it refitted and renamed Dancing Hare.

Design
Built in 1986 for Emad Khashoggi by Amels of Makkum, Netherlands, it was the first of series of Jon Bannenberg-designed super yachts. The yacht exterior includes a flared bow, lozenge-shaped ports, vertical windows and mullions and a sculpted mast complex.

Robert Maxwell
Khashoggi, also developer of the Château Louis XIV and the Palais Rose, abandoned the project for the yacht and in 1986 sold the vessel to Robert Maxwell who named it Lady Ghislaine after his daughter Ghislaine. In 1991, it was the base for Maxwell in New York City, moored on the East River as he negotiated with the unions over his purchase of the New York Daily News.

Maxwell's death
On 5 November 1991, at the age of 68, Maxwell was on board Lady Ghislaine, which was cruising off the Canary Islands. Maxwell's body was subsequently found floating in the Atlantic Ocean. He was later buried in Jerusalem. The official verdict was accidental drowning, though some commentators have surmised that he may have committed suicide or been murdered.

Subsequent owners
After Maxwell's death the yacht was purchased by an Arabian businessman, who sold her in 2017 to Anna Murdoch, at one time the wife of Rupert Murdoch. It was only after the sale the new owner discovered the yacht had previously been owned by Maxwell. After a refit at the Balk Shipyard in Urk, Netherlands, over the winter, the vessel was renamed Dancing Hare in May 2018.

See also
 List of motor yachts by length

References

External links
 Pictures/details on Lady Mona K

Motor yachts
Ships built in the Netherlands
1986 ships
Robert Maxwell